Pseudomonas sRNA P9 is a ncRNA that was predicted using bioinformatic tools in the genome of the opportunistic pathogen Pseudomonas aeruginosa and its expression verified by northern blot analysis.

P9 appears to be conserved in several Pseudomonas species in addition to Bordetella species. In both Pseudomonas and Bordetella species P9 appears to be located upstream of a predicted threonine dehydratase gene. P9 has a predicted Rho independent terminator at the 3′ end but the function of P9 is unknown.

See also

Pseudomonas sRNA P1
Pseudomonas sRNA P11
Pseudomonas sRNA P15
Pseudomonas sRNA P16
Pseudomonas sRNA P24
Pseudomonas sRNA P26

References

External links
 

Non-coding RNA